The 1914 Senboku earthquake (Japanese: 1914年秋田仙北地震) occurred on March 15, 1914, at 04:59 or 05:00 local time (or March 14 at 20:00 UTC) according to various sources in northern Japan. The earthquake had a magnitude of  7.0.

The epicenter was in Akita Prefecture, Japan. Ninety-four people died and 324 were injured. Senboku District (Japanese: 仙北郡) was seriously affected. The earthquake caused liquefaction. Explosions simultaneous with the earthquake were reported in Mount Asama.

References

External links

Further reading 

Senboku
1914 in Japan
March 1914 events
Earthquakes of the Taishō period
1914 disasters in Japan